Michael H. Barnett (born May 21, 1961, in Montebello, California, United States) is an American athlete who competes in the javelin. He competed in the 1992 Summer Olympics, finishing 7th.

Following the prime of his athletic career, Barnett went into coaching at Azusa Pacific University.  He coached decathlete Bryan Clay to the 2008 gold medal in the decathlon. He also was part of the track and field team in the Spanish club Larios A.A.M. now named Asociación Atlética Moratalaz, directed by Rafael Pajaron.

References

1951 births
Living people
Athletes (track and field) at the 1991 Pan American Games
Athletes (track and field) at the 1992 Summer Olympics
Olympic track and field athletes of the United States
American male javelin throwers
Track and field athletes from California
Pan American Games medalists in athletics (track and field)
Pan American Games silver medalists for the United States
People from Montebello, California
Medalists at the 1991 Pan American Games